Kostas Flevarakis (born 24 May 1969) is a Greek professional basketball coach, currently serving as head coach for Hungarian team Soproni KC.

Coaching career
After coaching in the junior teams of PAOK from 1988 to 1995, Flevarakis started working as an assistant coach with the Greek Basket League club PAOK in 1995. He became the head coach of PAOK in 1998. With PAOK, he won the Greek Cup in 1999. He became the head coach of the Greek club AEK in 2010.

Flevarakis worked as an assistant coach for the Milwaukee Bucks NBA Summer League team in 2001.

When he took over Soproni KC in the autumn of 2021, the team had a record of 2-7, and were out of the playoffs. Following Flevarakis' appointment, the team went 13 games unbeaten, the longest win streak in the Hungarian first division, and climbed up to second place in the standings. The streak finally ended on February 16, following a 91–71 loss against Kecskemét.

Scouting career
Flevarakis was also a scout for the NBA club the Denver Nuggets.

Awards and accomplishments
Greek Cup Winner: (1999)
Cypriot Cup Winner: (2006)

References

External links
FIBA Europe Profile
Euroleague.net Profile
Diamond Sports Agency Profile
Eurobasket.com Profile
AEK Profile

1969 births
Living people
AEK B.C. coaches
Aries Trikala B.C. coaches
AZS Koszalin coaches
Basketball Löwen Braunschweig coaches
BC Astana coaches
Greek basketball coaches
Greek expatriate basketball people in Germany
Greek expatriate basketball people in Poland
Ilysiakos B.C. coaches
Kolossos Rodou B.C. coaches
Keravnos B.C. coaches
Makedonikos B.C. coaches
Panellinios B.C. coaches
P.A.O.K. BC coaches
Polpak Świecie coaches
Rethymno B.C. coaches
Sportspeople from Thessaloniki